The Beasley-Parham House is located in the vicinity of Greenbrier, Tennessee, United States. The house is a double pen dogtrot design, consisting of two log pens, each with an exterior chimney, that were originally connected by an open breezeway (the "dogtrot"). The breezeway was enclosed with siding some time before the end of the 19th century.

It was listed on the National Register of Historic Places in 1988.

References

Houses on the National Register of Historic Places in Tennessee
Houses completed in 1840
Houses in Williamson County, Tennessee
Greek Revival houses in Tennessee
Dogtrot architecture in Tennessee
Double pen architecture in Tennessee
National Register of Historic Places in Williamson County, Tennessee